Kelly Morrison (born February 2, 1969) is an American doctor and politician. A member of the Minnesota Democratic–Farmer–Labor Party, Morrison has been a member of the Minnesota Senate since 2023. She previously served in the Minnesota House of Representatives.

Morrison represents District 45 in the western Twin Cities metropolitan area. Her district spans from the northern part of Minnetonka, Minnesota, to Lake Minnetonka, to Minnetrista, Minnesota. Morrison was first elected in 2018 by narrowly defeating Republican incumbent Cindy Pugh. She was reelected by a similarly small margin in 2020.

Early life, education, and career
Morrison was born in Minneapolis, Minnesota, and graduated from The Blake School. She attended Yale University and  graduated cum laude with a Bachelor of Arts in history, and attended Case Western Reserve University, graduating Alpha Omega Alpha with a Doctor of Medicine.

Morrison is a practicing obstetrician and gynecologist.

Minnesota House of Representatives
Morrison was first elected to the Minnesota House of Representatives in 2018, defeating Republican incumbent Cindy Pugh. She was reelected in 2020 after defeating candidate Andrew Myers. During the 2021-2022 session Morrison served as an assistant majority leader for the Minnesota DFL.

2021-2022 Committee Assignments:

 Early Childhood Finance and Policy
 Environment and Natural Resources Finance and Policy
 Health Finance and Policy
 Health Finance and Policy: Preventive Health Policy Division

2019-2020 Committee Assignments:

 Health and Human Services Policy
 Education Finance Division/Health and Human Services Finance Division: Early Childhood Finance and Policy Division
 Environment and Natural Resources Finance
 Water Division

Personal life
Morrison and her husband, John Willoughby, have three children. She resides in Deephaven, Minnesota. Morrison has served on several boards. These include Milkweed Editions, YWCA-Minneapolis, and Planned Parenthood.

Electoral History

In 2022, Morrison opted to retire from the Minnesota House of Representatives and run for the newly created Senate District 45. She defeated her opponent, Kathleen Fowke, as part of the 2022 Minnesota Senate election.

In 2020, Morrison faced Republican Andrew Myers, who she narrowly defeated as part of the 2020 Minnesota House of Representatives election.

In 2018, Morrison faced incumbent Republican Cindy Pugh, who had represented the district since 2013. Morrison defeated Pugh as part of the 2018 Minnesota House of Representatives election.

References

External links

 Official House of Representatives website
 Official campaign website

1969 births
Living people
Politicians from Minneapolis
People from Deephaven, Minnesota
Yale University alumni
Case Western Reserve University alumni
Democratic Party members of the Minnesota House of Representatives
21st-century American politicians
21st-century American women politicians
Women state legislators in Minnesota